is a Japanese footballer currently playing as a defender for Gamba Osaka.

Career statistics

Club
.

Notes

References

External links

2003 births
Living people
Association football people from Osaka Prefecture
Japanese footballers
Association football defenders
J3 League players
Gamba Osaka players
Gamba Osaka U-23 players